Brachypetersius is a genus of African tetras found in Middle Africa.  There are currently six described species.

Species
 Brachypetersius altus (Boulenger, 1899)
 Brachypetersius cadwaladeri (Fowler, 1930)
 Brachypetersius gabonensis Poll, 1967
 Brachypetersius huloti (Poll, 1954)
 Brachypetersius notospilus (Pellegrin, 1930)
 Brachypetersius pseudonummifer Poll, 1967

References
 

Alestidae
Fish of Africa